This following is a complete filmography of Indian actor and producer Dharmendra Deol. He was born on 8 December 1935, and made his debut in 1960 with film Dil Bhi Tera Hum Bhi Tere at the age of 25. He has starred in more than 300 films.

1960–1969

Dil Bhi Tera Hum Bhi Tere (1960) as Ashok
Shola Aur Shabnam (1961) as Bunnu 
Boy Friend (1961) as Inspector Sunil Singh 
Soorat Aur Seerat (1962)  
Anpadh (1962) as Deepak M. Nath
Shaadi (1962) as Ramesh R. Malhotra 
Bandini (1963) as  Dr. Devendra
Begaana (1963) as Prakash 
Pooja Ke Phool (1964) as Balraj 
Mera Qasoor Kya Hai (1964) 
Haqeeqat (1964) as Captain Bahadur Singh
Ganga Ki Lahren (1964) as Ashok
Ayee Milan Ki Bela (1964) as Ranjit
Aap Ki Parchhaiyan (1964) as Chandramohan Chopra 'Channi'
Main Bhi Ladki Hoon (1964) as Ram
Purnima  (1965) as Prakash
Neela Aakash (1965) as Aakash
Kaajal (1965) ... Rajesh 
Chand Aur Suraj (1965) as Surajprakash A. Malik / Suraj
Akashdeep (1965)
Phool Aur Patthar (1966) as Shakti Singh / Shaaka 
Mohabbat Zindagi Hai (1966) as Amar
Mamta (1966) as Barrister Indraneel
Dil Ne Phir Yaad Kiya (1966) as Ashok
Devar (1966) as Shankar J. Rai / Bhola
Baharen Phir Bhi Aayengi (1966) as Jitendra 'Jiten' Gupta 
Anupama (1966) as Ashok
Aaye Din Bahar Ke (1966) as Ravi
Paari (1966) as Ghanashyam Dhali 
Majhli Didi (1967) as Bipinchandra 'Bipin'
Jab Yaad Kisi Ki Aati Hai (1967)
Ghar Ka Chirag (1967)
Dulhan Ek Raat Ki (1967) as Ashok
Chandan Ka Palna (1967) as Ajit
Shikar (1968) as Ajay Singh
Mere Hamdam Mere Dost (1968) as Sunil
Izzat (1968) as Shekhar / Dilip P. Singh (Double Role)
Baharon Ki Manzil (1968) as Dr. Rajesh Khanna
Baazi (1968) as D. S. P. Ajay
Ankhen (1968) as Sunil
Yakeen (1969) as Rajesh/Jackoss (Double Role)
Satyakam (1969) as Satyapriya 'Satya' Acharya
Pyar Hi Pyar (1969) as Vijay Pratap
Khamoshi (1969) as  Dev (Patient No. 24) (Guest appearance) 
The Gold Medal (1969) as Acharya (Guest appearance)
Aya Sawan Jhoom Ke as Jaishankar 'Jai' 
Aadmi Aur Insaan (1969) as Munish Mehra
Dharti Kahe Pukar Ke (1969) as Narrator

1970–1979

Man Ki Aankhen (1970) as Rajesh Agarwal
Tum Haseen Main Jawaan (1970) as Sunil
Sharafat (1970) as Rajesh 
Mera Naam Joker (1970) as Mahendra Singh
Soldier Thakur Daler Singh (1970)
Kankan De Ole (1970) as Banta Singh, Punjabi language film
Kab? Kyoon? Aur Kahan? (1970) as C. I. D. Inspector Anand
Jeevan Mrityu (1970) as Ashok Tandon / Vikram Singh
Ishq Par Zor Nahin (1970) as Ram
Jeevitha Samaram (1971) Malayalam film 
Rakhwala (1971) as  Deepak 
Naya Zamana (1971) as Anoop
Mera Gaon Mera Desh (1971) as Ajit 
Guddi (1971) as Himself (Special appearance)
Seeta Aur Geeta (1972) as Raka
Samadhi (1972) as Lakhan Singh/Jaswant Singh/Ajay (Double role)
Raja Jani (1972) as Rajkumar Singh 'Raja'
Lalkar (1972) as Major Ram Kapoor
Do Chor (1972) as Tony
Anokha Milan (1972) as Ghanshyam "Ghana"
Loafer as Ranjit
Yaadon Ki Baaraat (1973) as Shankar
Phagun (1973) as Gopal (Special appearance)
Keemat (1973) as Gopal
Kahani Kismat Ki (1973) as Ajit Sharma
Jugnu (1973) as Ashok Roy / Jugnu
Black Mail (1973) as Kailash Gupta
Jheel Ke Us Paar (1973) as Sameer Rai
Jwar Bhata (1973) as Balraj Prasad  'Billoo'
Resham Ki Dori (1974) as Ajit Singh
Patthar Aur Payal (1974) as Ranjit Singh
Pocketmaar (1974) as Shankar
Dukh Bhanjan Tera Naam (1974)
Do Sher (1974) (Guest appearance)
Dost (1974) as Manav
International Crook (1974) as Shekhar
The Gold Medal (1974) (Guest appearance)
Kunwara Baap (1974) (Guest appearance)
Teri Meri Ik Jindri (1975) (Guest appearance)
Saazish (1975) as Jaideep 'Jai'
Pratiggya (1975) as Inspector Devendra Singh/Ajit D. Singh (Double Role)
Kahte Hain Mujhko Raja (1975) as Balram
Ek Mahal Ho Sapno Ka (1975) as Vishal
Dhoti Lota Aur Chowpatty (1975) (Guest appearance)
Chupke Chupke (1975) as Dr. Parimal Tripathi / Pyare Mohan
Chaitali (1975)
Apne Dushman (1975) as Brijesh
Sholay (1975) as Veeru
Santo Banto (1976) (Guest appearance)
Chhoti Si Baat (1976) (Guest appearance)
Kahtey Hain Mujhko Raja (1976) (Guest appearance)
Charas (1976) as Suraj Kumar
Maa (1976) as Vijay
Tinku (1977) (Guest appearance)
Swami (1977) (Guest appearance)
Kinara (1977)…(Special appearance)
Aaina (1977) (Guest appearance)
Khel Khiladi Ka (1977) as Shaki Lutera/Raja Saab/ Ajit
Dream Girl (1977) as Anupam Verma
Do Chehere (1977) (Guest appearance)
Dharam Veer (1977) as Dharam Singh
Charandas (1977) (Guest appearance)
Chala Murari Hero Banne (1977)
Chacha Bhatija (1977) as  Shankar
Shalimar (1978) as S.S. Kumar
Phandebaaz (1978)
Dillagi (1978)
Azaad (1978) as Ashok 
Dil Kaa Heera (1979)
Kartavya (1979)

1980–1989

Chunaoti (1980) as Shakti Singh (Special appearance) 
Ram Balram (1980) as Ram
The Burning Train (1980) as Ashok Singh 
Alibaba Aur 40 Chor (1980) as Alibaba
Insaaf Ka Tarazu (1980) as Soldier (Guest appearance)
Professor Pyarelal (1981) as Ram / Professor Pyarelal
Krodhi (1981) as Vikramjit Singh (Vicky) / Acharya Shradhanand 
Katilon Ke Kaatil (1981) as Ajit / Badshah
Aas Paas (1981) as Arun Choudhury
Naseeb (1981) as Himself in a Song (Special appearance)
Teesri Aankh (1982) as Ashok
Samraat (1982) as Ram
Main Intequam Loonga (1982) as Kumar Agnihotri 'Bitto'
Ghazab (1982) as Ajay Singh 'Munna' / Vijay Singh (Double Role)
Do Dishayen (1982)
Baghavat (1982) as Amar Singh
Badle Ki Aag (1982) as Sher Singh 'Shera' / Jaggu
Rajput (1982) as Manu Pratap Singh
Ambri (1983) as Dharam Singh
Putt Jattan De (1983) as Chaudhary Dharam Singh (Punjabi film)
Razia Sultan (1983) as Yakut Jamaluddin 
Naukar Biwi Ka (1983) as Deepak Kumar / Raja
Jaani Dost (1983) as Raju
Andhaa Kaanoon (1983) as Truck Driver (Guest appearance)
Qayamat (1983) as Shyam / Rajeshwar
Sunny (1984) as Indrajeet
Ranjhan Mera Yaar (1984) (Punjabi film)
Raaj Tilak (1984) as Zoravar Singh 
Jeene Nahi Doonga (1984) as Roshan / Raka (Double role)
Jagir (1984) as Shankar
Dharam Aur Kanoon (1984) as Rahim Khan
Baazi (1984) as Inspector Ajay Sharma
Insaaf Kaun Karega (1984) as  Veeru
Jhutha Sach (1984) 
Rajhan Mera Yaar (Punjabi Film) (1984) 
Karishma Kudrat Kaa (1985) as Vijay / Karan (Double Role)
Ghulami (1985) as Ranjit Singh
Sitamgar (1985) as Sonu / Shankar
Saveray Wali Gaadi (1986) Sher Singh (Guest appearance)
Mohabbat Ki Kasam (1986) as Shop-Owner
Main Balwan (1986) as Inspector / D. C. P. Chaudhary
Sultanat (1986) as General Khalid
Mit Jayenge Mitane Wale (1987)
Watan Ke Rakhwale (1987) as Mahavir
Mera Karam Mera Dharam (1987) as Ajay Shankar Sharma
Mard Ki Zabaan (1987) as Laxman Chauhan
Insaaf Ki Pukar (1987) as Vijay Singh
Dadagiri (1987) as Dharma Dada
Aag Hi Aag (1987) as Bahadur Singh / Sher Singh
Superman (1987) as Superman's Dad (Guest appearance)
Insaniyat Ke Dushman (1987) as Inspector Shekhar Kapoor
Loha (1987) as Inspector Amar
Hukumat (1987) as Inspector Arjun Singh
Jaan Hatheli Pe (1987) as Soni
Zalzala (1988) as Inspector Shiv Kumar
Soorma Bhopali (1988) as Mahendra Singh / Dharmendra Himself (Double Role)
Sone Pe Suhaaga (1988) as Vikram / C. B. I. Officer Ashwini Kumar
Khatron Ke Khiladi (1988) as Balwant / Karamveer / Teesri Adalat
Mardon Wali Baat (1988) as Yadvinder Singh
Mahaveera (1988) as Ajay Verma
Paap Ko Jalaa Kar Raakh Kar Doonga (1988) as Shankar
Ganga Tere Desh Mein (1988) as Vijay Nath
Sachai Ki Taqat (1989) as Constable Ram Singh
Nafrat Ki Aandhi (1989) as Sonu
Hathyar (1989) as Khushal Khan
Kasam Suhaag Ki (1989)
Ilaaka (1989) as Inspector Dharam Verma (Special appearance)
Batwara (1989) as Sumer Singh
Elaan-E-Jung (1989)
Sikka (1989) as Vijay
Shehzaade (1989) as Subedhar Zorawar Singh / Inspector Shankar Shrivastav (Double role)

1990–1999

Veeru Dada (1990) as Veeru Dada 
Vardi (1990) as Havaldar Bhagwan Singh (Special appearance)
Qurbani Jatt Di (1990)
Pyar Ka Karz (1990)
Naakabandi (1990) as Veer "Veera" Singh
Humse Na Takrana (1990)
Trinetra (1991) as Raja (Special appearance)
Mast Kalandar (1991)
Kohraam (1991) as Arjun
Farishtay (1991) as Veeru
Paap Ki Aandhi (1991) as Dharma / Mangal (Double Role)
Dushman Devta (1991) as Shiva
Khule-Aam (1992) as Shiva
Zulm Ki Hukumat (1992) as Pitamber Kohli
Waqt Ka Badshah (1992)
Tahalka (1992) as Ex-Major Dharam Singh
Virodhi (1992) as Inspector Shekhar
Humlaa (1992) as Bhawani
Kal Ki Awaz (1992)
Agnee Morcha (1993)
Aag Ka Toofan (1993) as Dharam Singh/ Arjun Singh Inspector (Double role)
Kundan (1993) 
Kshatriya (1993) as Maharaj Prthivi Singh 
Maha Shaktishaali (1994)
Juaari (1994) as Police Inspector Dharam Singh
Policewala Gunda (1995) as A.C.P. Ajit Singh
Maidan-E-Jung (1995) as Shankar
Aazmayish (1995) as Shankar Singh Rathod
Taaqat (1995) as Shakti Singh
Hum Sab Chor Hain (1995)
Fauji (1995)
Veer (1995) as Veeru Bhaiya / Veer (Double role)
Smuggler (1996)
Return of Jewel Thief (1996) as Police Commissioner Surya Dev Singh
Himmatvar (1996) as Sultan
Aatank (1996) as Jesu
Mafia (1996) as Fauji Ajit Singh
Loha (1997) as Shankar
Jeeo Shaan Se (1997) as Bramha / Vishnu / Mahesh (Triple Role)
Gundagardi (1997)
Agnee Morcha (1997)
Hamaara Faisla (1998) 
Pyaar Kiya To Darna Kya (1998) as Thakur Ajay Singh / Chacha
Zulm O Situm (1998) as SP Arun
 Sherkhan (1998)
Nyaydaata (1999) as DCP Ram
Munnibai (1999) 
Lohpurush (1999)

2000–2009

Sultaan (2000) as Sultan Singh (Extended special appearance)
 The Revenge: Geeta Mera Naam (2000) as Baba Thakur
Meri Jung Ka Elaan (2000) as Ajit Singh
Kaali Ki Saugandh (2000) as Sultan Singh
 Jallad No. 1 (2000) as Shankar
 Bhai Thakur (film) (2000)
 Jagira (2001)
 Saugandh Geeta Ki (2001)
 Zakhmi Sherni (2001)
 Bhooka Sher (2001) as Ranbir Singh
Reshma aur Sultan (2002)
Border Kashmir (2002)
Shiva Ka Insaaf (2003) as Shiva
Kaise Kahoon Ke... Pyaar Hai (2003) as Dharam
Tada (2003) as Balraj Singh Rana
Sabse Badi Ganga Ki Saugandh (2004) (Guest appearance)
Hum Kaun Hai? (2004) as Virendra 'Viru' (Guest appearance)
Kis Kis Ki Kismat (2004) as Hasmukh Mehta
Life in a... Metro (2007) as Amol
Apne (2007) as Baldev Singh Chaudhary
Johnny Gaddaar (2007) as Sheshadri
Om Shanti Om (2007) as Himself in song Deewangi Deewangi
Har Pal (2009) as Baba

2010–2019

Yamla Pagla Deewana (2011) as Dharam Singh Dhillon
Tell Me O Kkhuda (2011) as Tony Costello
Yamla Pagla Deewana 2 (2013) as Dharam Singh Dhillon
Dusman Ke Khoon Paani Ha (2014)
Singh Saab the Great (2013) as Cameo in song 'Daru Band Kal Se'
Double Di Trouble (2014) as Ajit / Manjit (Double role) 
Second Hand Husband (2015) as Ajit Singh
Jora 10 Numbaria (2017) as Jagga Baba
Yamla Pagla Deewana: Phir Se (2018) as Jaywant Parmar

2020–present

Television

References

External links
 

Indian filmographies
Male actor filmographies